The women's 400 metres at the 2018 IAAF World U20 Championships was held at Ratina Stadium on 10, 11 and 12 July.

Records

Results

Heats
Qualification: First 4 of each heat (Q) and the 4 fastest times (q) qualified for the semifinals.

Semifinals
Qualification: First 2 of each heat (Q) and the 2 fastest times (q) qualified for the final.

Final

References

400 metres
400 metres at the World Athletics U20 Championships